Feel the Fire is the fourth solo album by Jermaine Jackson, and his second post-Jackson 5 solo album. It was dedicated: "to Jai, born January 27, 1977".

Production
Feel the Fire is the first album for which Jackson did some producing and writing for himself. The album includes Tower of Power's horn section, and Stevie Wonder's ex-wife Syreeta. Its only single release was the Earth, Wind & Fire-inspired "You Need To Be Loved", which has a saxophone solo by Lenny Pickett.

Track listing
Side A
"Feel the Fire (Burning from Me to You)" (Jermaine Jackson, Michael McGloiry, Kathy Wakefield) - 4:34
"You Need to Be Loved" (Jackson, McGloiry, Wakefield) - 5:50
"Strong Love" (Greg Wright, Syreeta Wright) - 3:14
"Git Up and Dance" (Jackson, McGloiry) - 3:15

Side B
"I Love You More" (McGloiry) - 3:34
"Happiness Is" (G. Wright, Karin Patterson) - 4:20
"Some Kind of Woman" (Michael L. Smith, Eddie Holland, Jr., Brian Holland) - 4:10
"Got to Get to You Girl" (Jackson) - 3:26
"Take Time" (McGloiry) - 3:50

 Executive producer: Berry Gordy
 Arrangers: Greg Adams, Greg Wright, Clay Drayton, Don Peake, Benjamin Wright, Gil Askey, H.B. Barnum, Greg Poree

Charts

Singles

References

External links
 Jermaine Jackson: Feel The Fire at Discogs

1977 albums
Jermaine Jackson albums
Albums arranged by H. B. Barnum
Motown albums
Soul albums by American artists